Zinc trifluoromethanesulfonate or zinc triflate is the zinc salt of trifluoromethanesulfonic acid. It is commonly used as a Lewis acid catalyst, e.g. in silylations.

A white powder, zinc triflate is commercially available, though some workers have experienced inconsistent results with zinc triflate from different sources. If desired, it may be prepared from reacting trifluoromethanesulfonic acid with zinc metal in acetonitrile, or with zinc carbonate in methanol:

Zn + 2 HOTf → Zn(OTf)2 + H2
ZnCO3 + 2 HOTf → Zn(OTf)2 + H2O + CO2 (OTf = CF3SO2)

References

triflate
Triflates
Acid catalysts